This article lists terrorist incidents in Iraq in 2017.

January
January 1 A suicide bombing killed six policeman in Najaf.
January 2 An ISIS car bomb killed 24 people in the Sadr district of Baghdad.
January 8 Two suicide car bombs kill twenty people in marketplaces located in the Shi'ite districts of Jamila and Baladiyat in Baghdad.

May
May 30: Al-Faqma ice cream parlor bombing - An ISIS suicide bombing killed over 30 people at an ice cream parlor in Baghdad.

September
September 14: A suicide attack killed 50 people and injured 80 in the Southern part of Iraq. ISIS claimed responsibility.

References

 
2017
Lists of terrorist incidents in 2017